David Stanley Lee was Archdeacon of Llandaff from 1991 to 1997.

Lee was born in 1930 and educated at the University of Wales; and ordained in 1958. After curacies in Caerau and Port Talbot – pioneering an industrial chaplaincy to the steelworks, he was Rector of Merthyr Tydfil until his appointment as Archdeacon.

References

Alumni of the University of Wales
1930 births
Archdeacons of Llandaff
Living people